The Municipality of Tišina is a municipality in the traditional region of Prekmurje in northeastern Slovenia. The seat of the municipality is the town of Tišina. Tišina became a municipality in 1994.

Settlements
In addition to the municipal seat of Tišina, the municipality also includes the following settlements:

 Borejci
 Gederovci
 Gradišče
 Krajina
 Murski Črnci
 Murski Petrovci
 Petanjci
 Rankovci
 Sodišinci
 Tropovci
 Vanča Vas

References

External links

Municipality of Tišina on Geopedia
Municipality of Tišina website

Tisina
1994 establishments in Slovenia